Babylonia was a region in Mesopotamia, and a kingdom up to 539 BC.

Babylonia may also refer to:
The region called Babylonia by Talmudic scholars from  AD; see Talmudic Academies in Babylonia
Babylonia (gastropod), a genus of sea snails
"Babylónia", a 1990 rock-pop song by Marika Gombitová
Fate/Grand Order - Absolute Demonic Front: Babylonia, a 2019 anime set in Babylonia

See also
Babylon, the capital city of Babylonia in ancient Mesopotamia